Husin bin Din (10 April 1953 — 11 June 2021) was a Malaysian politician from the Malaysian Islamic Party (PAS). He served as the Member of the Perak State Legislative Assembly for Selinsing from 2008 to 2018.

Husin died of asphyxiation on 11 June 2021 at 10.45 am at Taiping Hospital at the age of 68.

Election results

References 

1953 births
2021 deaths
People from Perak
Malaysian people of Malay descent
Malaysian Muslims
Malaysian Islamic Party politicians
Members of the Perak State Legislative Assembly